Population and Development Review is a quarterly peer-reviewed academic journal published by Wiley-Blackwell on behalf of the Population Council. It was established in 1975  and the journal is co-edited by Raya Muttarak and Joshua Wilde. The journal covers population studies, the relationships between population and economic, environmental, and social change, and related thinking on public policy. Content types are original research articles, commentaries, data and perspectives on statistics, archival documents on population issues, book reviews, and official documents from population agencies or related organizations. 

According to the Journal Citation Reports, the journal has a 2021 impact factor of 10.515, ranking the first out of 28 journals in the category "Demography" and 6th out of 147 journals in the category "Sociology".

Past Editor
2013-2021 Landis MacKellar (co-edited with Geoffrey McNicoll, 2013-2017 )
1975-2012 Paul Demeny (co-edited with Geoffrey McNicoll, 2008-2012 )

References

External links

Wiley-Blackwell academic journals
English-language journals
Publications established in 1975
Sociology journals
Quarterly journals
Demography journals